Dryas drummondii is a species of flowering plant in the rose family known by the common names yellow mountain-avens, yellow dryas, or yellow dryad. It is native to Alaska, Canada, and northern states in the contiguous United States. This species is actinorhizal, able to live in symbiosis with nitrogen-fixing bacteria.

References

Dryadoideae